Ankirihitra is a town and commune in Madagascar. It belongs to the district of Ambato-Boeni, which is a part of Boeny Region. The population of the commune was estimated to be approximately 9,000 in a 2001 commune census.

Only primary schooling is available. The majority, an estimated 99%, of the population consists of farmers.  The most important crop is rice, while other important products are maize and cassava.  Additionally, fishing employs 1% of the population.

References and notes 

Populated places in Boeny